Luke Ryan (born 6 February 1996) is a professional Australian rules footballer playing for the Fremantle Football Club in the Australian Football League (AFL). A versatile player Ryan is a Doig Medalist as well as an All-Australian.

Early career
Originally from Melbourne's northern suburbs, Ryan played junior football for Aberfeldie, Moonee Valley and Maribyrnong Park Football Clubs in the Essendon District Football League as well as some games for Calder Cannons in the TAC Cup. He then played for the Coburg Football Club in the Victorian Football League (VFL) in 2016, winning the Fothergill–Round Medal as the most promising young player in the league.

AFL career
He was recruited as a mature age player to Fremantle with their third selection, 66th overall, in the 2016 AFL draft. He made his AFL debut in round 11 of the 2017 AFL season against Collingwood at Domain Stadium, after playing well for Fremantle's reserves team, Peel Thunder, in the West Australian Football League (WAFL).

Ryan received the AFL Rising Star nomination for round 20 after gaining 28 possessions and taking 16 marks in the Dockers' 23-point win over the Gold Coast Suns at Domain Stadium.  Ryan also received two votes in the 2017 Brownlow Medal from this round 20 match. Ryan kicked his first AFL goal in round 13 of the 2018 season during fremantle's 57 point win over Carlton.
 
Luke Ryan was awarded the Beacon Award for the best first year player during the 2017 AFL season. An outstanding performance throughout the 2020 AFL season would see Ryan win the Doig Medal and named in the 2020 All-Australian team.

Ryan played his 100th game during round 16 of the 2022 AFL season against Port Adelaide. Ryan signed a four-year contract extension following the 2022 season tying him to Fremantle until at least 2027.

Statistics
 Statistics are correct to the end of round 10, 2022

|- style="background-color: #EAEAEA"
! scope="row" style="text-align:center" | 2017
|
| 38 || 11 || 0 || 0 || 120 || 55 || 175 || 69 || 44 || 0.0 || 0.0 || 10.9 || 5.0 || 15.9 || 6.3 || 4.0 || 2
|-
! scope="row" style="text-align:center" | 2018
|
| 38 || 20 || 2 || 1 || 260 || 102 || 362 || 131 || 43 || 0.1 || 0.1 || 13.0 || 5.1 || 18.1 || 6.6 || 2.2 || 0
|- style="background-color: #EAEAEA"
! scope="row" style="text-align:center" | 2019
|
| 38 || 18 || 1 || 0 || 263 || 105 || 368 || 94 || 47 || 0.1 || 0.0 || 14.6 || 5.8 || 20.4 || 5.2 || 2.6 || 5
|-
! scope="row" style="text-align:center" | 2020
|
| 13 || 17 || 0 || 0 || 251 || 65 || 316 || 88 || 20 || 0.0 || 0.0 || 14.8 || 3.8 || 18.6 || 5.2 || 1.2 || 6
|- style="background-color: #EAEAEA"
! scope="row" style="text-align:center" | 2021
|
| 13 || 19 || 0 || 0 || 332 || 82 || 414 || 136 || 34 || 0.0 || 0.0 || 17.5 || 4.3 || 21.8 || 7.2 || 1.8 || 3
|-
! scope="row" style="text-align:center" | 2022
|
| 13 || 10 || 0 || 1 || 153 || 41 || 194 || 63 || 12 || 0.0 || 0.1 || 15.3 || 4.1 || 19.4 || 6.3 || 1.2 || TBA
|- class="sortbottom"
! colspan=3| Career
! 95
! 3
! 2
! 1379
! 450
! 1829
! 581
! 200
! 0.0
! 0.0
! 14.5
! 4.7
! 19.3
! 6.1
! 2.1
! 16
|}

Notes

References

External links

1996 births
Living people
Calder Cannons players
Coburg Football Club players
Australian rules footballers from Victoria (Australia)
Fremantle Football Club players
Peel Thunder Football Club players
All-Australians (AFL)